Robinsonův ostrov 2017 was the first season of the Czech version of the Swedish television series Expedition Robinson. This season premiered on January 16, 2017.

Contestants

External links
http://robinson.nova.cz/

Expedition Robinson seasons
Czech reality television series
Television shows filmed in the Philippines